Tamer Haj Mohamad (born April 3, 1990, in Homs) is a Syrian football player who plays for Tishreen SC, on loan from Al-Karamah in Syria. He is an ethnic Circassian.

Club career
Haj Mohamad started his career with Al-Karamah, then played for Al-Mabarrah and Al-Safa in Lebanon, Al-Faisaly in Jordan, Naft Al-Wasat and Erbil in Iraq, Dhofar in Oman, Ohod in Saudi Arabia, Hutteen in Syria, Al-Salmiya in Kuwait, then returned to Al-Karamah in September 2020.

International career
Haj Mohamad played between 2007 and 2008 for the Under-17 and the Under-19 Syrian national team. He was a part of the Syrian U-17 national team in the FIFA U-17 World Cup 2007. in South Korea. He played against Argentina, Spain and Honduras in the group-stage of the FIFA U-17 World Cup 2007.

He played for the Syrian U-19 national team in the AFC U-19 Championship 2008 in Saudi Arabia, and was a member of the Syrian U-23 national team. He was a part of the Syrian U-23 national team in the Mediterranean Games 2009 in Italy.

He played for Syria at the 2019 AFC Asian Cup.

National Team Career Statistics

International goals
Scores and results list Syria's goal tally first.

Honour and titles

Club
Al-Karamah
Syrian Premier League (2 titles): 2008, 2009
Syrian Cup (3 titles): 2008, 2009, 2010
Syrian Super Cup (1 title): 2008
AFC Cup: 2009 Runner-up

Naft Al-Wasat
Iraqi Premier League:  2014–15

References

External links
 
 Career stats at goalzz.com
 Career stats at Kooora.com (Arabic)
 Haj Mohamad`s goal against Al-Wahdat in the AFC Cup 2009 (2009-04-07) (youtube.com)

1990 births
Living people
Syrian footballers
Syrian expatriate footballers
Syrian expatriate sportspeople in Jordan
Syrian people of Circassian descent
Syria international footballers
Expatriate footballers in Jordan
Expatriate footballers in Lebanon
Syrian expatriate sportspeople in Saudi Arabia
Expatriate footballers in Saudi Arabia
Syrian expatriate sportspeople in Lebanon
Expatriate footballers in Iraq
Syrian expatriate sportspeople in Iraq
Al-Karamah players
Ohod Club players
Saudi Professional League players
Association football midfielders
Sportspeople from Homs
Al-Faisaly SC players
2019 AFC Asian Cup players
Syrian Premier League players
Al Mabarra Club players
Safa SC players
Lebanese Premier League players
Hutteen Latakia players
Dhofar Club players
Syrian expatriate sportspeople in Oman
Expatriate footballers in Oman
Al Salmiya SC players
Syrian expatriate sportspeople in Kuwait
Expatriate footballers in Kuwait
Competitors at the 2009 Mediterranean Games
Mediterranean Games competitors for Syria
Kuwait Premier League players